Mollugo verticillata, the green carpetweed (also known as Indian chickweed), is a rapidly spreading annual plant from tropical America. In eastern North America, it is a common weed growing in disturbed areas. It forms a prostrate circular mat that can quickly climb over nearby plants and obstacles. The species has been reported from every state in the United States except Alaska, Hawaii, and Utah, as well as from British Columbia, Manitoba. Ontario, Quebec, New Brunswick and Nova Scotia.  Although considered an invasive weed, M. verticillata is also known to be edible. Archaeological evidence has shown that  M. verticillata has been in North America for about 3000 years. Sometimes also referred to as "Indian chickweed", in China this plant is referred to as zhong leng su mi cao.

Description
Carpetweed has narrow, whorled leaves, 3-8 at each node.  At maturity the plant may lose its characteristic basal rosette formation. Leaves are approximately 1–3 cm in length and possess an obovate shape. Leaf apex may vary from rounded to acute. The plant will grow and sprawl across the soil due to its habit of prostrate growth and form mats. The flowers are usually in clusters of 2-5, blooming from July through September. Flowers are white or greenish white with tiny 5–15 mm stalks. Flowers quickly turn into fruit that is egg shaped and 1.5–4 mm in length. The dehiscent capsule opens at maturity. The seeds are 0.5 mm long and are red to rusty brown in coloration.

Taxonomy
Advances in molecular genetic sequencing has improved understandings of the taxonomic relationship in the family Molluginaceae which had previously not been as inclusive. Genera from Molluginaceae had previously been placed under Aizoaceae, Nyctaginaceae, and Phytolaccaceae before recent studies. The genus Mollugo L. currently comprises about 35 species of annual herbs. Several sub taxa species of M. verticillata have been reported due to its varying morphological nature however they are not thoroughly documented. Mollugo verticillata has many accepted synonyms including: Mollugo dichotoma, Mollugo diffusa, Mollugo costata, Pharnaceum arenarium, and Pharnaceum verticellatum to name a few. It is also referred to as alfombra in Spanish, and mollugine in French. Other closely related sister taxa include Mollugo floriana, Mollugo flavescens, Mollugo snodgrassii, Mollugo crockeri, and Mollugo enneandra.

Distribution and habitat
The wide range of M. verticillata is apparent across North America, Brazil, Colombia, Mexico, West Indies, Central America, South America, Eurasia and Africa. There is agreement among some studies that the carpetweed origin is from the New World tropics and it spread into more temperate zones afterwards. Overall the place of origin has been attributed to the tropics or subtropics of the northern and southern hemispheres. Commonly found in warm and/or wet environments across North America.

Uses
Along with Glinus (Molluginaceae), Mollugo are edible plants that have historically been utilized as vegetables or for medicinal benefits. The family Molluginaceae has been studied for its therapeutic characteristics due to the production of triterpenes saponins and flavonoids. One study suggested that ethanolic extracts of M. verticillata could be a potential immunomodulator. The chemical makeup in members of the family Molluginaceae in general has anti-fungal and anti-inflammatory properties.

Ethnobotany
Carbon dating has dated seeds of M. verticillata found in Icehouse Bottom Tennessee back to 1170- 140 B.C. Other seeds found in Troyville, Louisiana were dated back to 500 A.D. It is unsure exactly when or how M. verticillata spread into temperate North America. European movements were not the cause of this migration because carbon dating reveals that the plant was in the Little Tennessee river valley 3000 years ago. Despite little apparent  food value, indigenous peoples may have had uses of M. verticillata that are unclear today. Carpetweed, also referred to as "Indian chickweed", was utilized as a potherb by the indigenous peoples of Southern Appalachia.

Conservation status
Carpetweed is considered to be globally secure. It is also credited as an invasive weed by USDA.gov. IUCN RedList states that the taxon has not been assessed for the IUCN Red List. Other accounts cite the weed as being native to the Continental US, Caribbean territories, Mexico and introduced to Canada. It can be found in disturbed habitats such as fields, parking lots and gardens.

References

External links
 Photographs
 Mollugo verticillata North American distribution map
 Conservation status

Molluginaceae
Plants described in 1753
Taxa named by Carl Linnaeus
Flora of the United States
Flora of Mexico
Flora of Central America
Flora of South America
Flora of British Columbia
Flora of Manitoba
Flora of Ontario
Flora of Quebec
Flora of New Brunswick
Flora of Nova Scotia